Conoclinium betonicifolium, the  betony-leaf mistflower or betonyleaf thoroughwort, is a North American species of flowering plants in the family Asteraceae. It is widespread across much of Mexico from Chihuahua to Quintana Roo, and has also been found in Texas and Guatemala.

Conoclinium betonicifolium is a perennial with a stem that runs close to the ground and sometimes roots at the nodes. One plant generally produces several flower heads, each with blue or purple disc florets but no ray florets.

References

External links
 photo of herbarium specimen, collected in Nuevo León

Eupatorieae
Flora of Mexico
Flora of Texas
Flora of Guatemala
Plants described in 1768